Rossfjord Church is a parish church of the Church of Norway in Senja Municipality in Troms og Finnmark county, Norway. It is located just northeast of the village of Rossfjordstraumen, along the coast of the Malangen fjord. It is one of the churches in the Lenvik parish which is part of the Senja prosti (deanery) in the Diocese of Nord-Hålogaland. The white, wooden church was built in a cruciform style here in 1885. The church seats about 250 people.

History
The white, wooden church was originally built in a cruciform style in 1822 in Lenvik at the Lenvik Church. It was designed using plans drawn up by an unknown architect. When a new Lenvik Church was constructed, this building was taken down and moved to its present location in Rossfjordstraumen in 1885 where it was rebuilt. The first worship service held in the newly reconstructed church was on 2 August 1885.

Media gallery

See also
List of churches in Nord-Hålogaland

References

Senja
Churches in Troms
Cruciform churches in Norway
Wooden churches in Norway
19th-century Church of Norway church buildings
Churches completed in 1885
1885 establishments in Norway